Lai King, or Lai King Hill, is the colloquial name for a residential area including a number of private housing and public housing estates, located on Mo Shek Shan, east of Kwai Chung, New Territories, Hong Kong. It is centred on Lai King Estate, but also refers to nearby public estates, including Cho Yiu Chuen, Lai Yiu Estate, Wah Yuen Chuen, and Kau Wa Keng, and private estates, such as Wonderland Villas and Highland Park.

Transport
Lai King has a very important MTR interchange station between the Tsuen Wan line and the Tung Chung line.

Education
Lai King is in Primary One Admission (POA) School Net 65, which includes multiple aided schools (schools operated independently of the government but funded with government money); none of the schools in the net are government schools.

Others
Lai King Estate
Lai King station

References 

 
Kwai Chung
Kwai Tsing District
Places in Hong Kong